Several ships of the Royal Navy have been named HMS Industry.

 , a sloop in service in 1765
 , purchased in 1794 as a fireship, but broken up in 1795
 , an  launched in 1814, fitted in 1824 to carry shells and ammunition; in 1835 fitted as a chapel ship for the Isle of Man; broken up 1846
 , an iron screw storeship launched and purchased in 1854, became a boom defence ship (BDS) in 1901, and was sold in 1911
  (Glasgow renamed 1900), launched 1901, Royal Fleet Auxiliary (RFA)-manned from 1914; as Q-ship used the names Tay and Tyne; torpedoed 1918 but reached harbour; sold 1924 for breaking up

Hired vessels
 HM Irish gun vessel Industry, 78 tons (bm) and six guns, served under contract 1803 to 1809, or 1806–10
 HM hired armed cutter

See also
  (renamed RFA Industry in 1920)

Citations

References
 
 

Royal Navy ship names